Faruque Ahamed is a playwright and actor in Bangladesh. He started his acting career by acting on stage while studying at the department of Geography and Environment of Jahangirnagar University. He was introduced across the country by playing a negative role called Rasik Lal in Baro rokom manus broadcast on Bangladesh Television. He was a regular face of popular playwright and writer Humayun Ahmed's drama.

Early life 
Faruque Ahamed was born in Manikganj District of Dhaka division. He studied at the department of Geography and Environment at Jahangirnagar University. Faruque Ahamed is the father of a daughter.

Career 
Faruque Ahamed joined Dhaka theatre in 1983. There he worked with actors like Humayun Faridi, Afzal Hossain, Suborna Mustafa, Shimul Yousuf, Raisul Islam Asad, Ahmed Rubel and Litu Anam. He was associated with theatre for about 25 years. While in theatre, he was significantly discussed with his performances in plays like Kirtankhola, pracho, Keramat Mandal, Chakra and Yavati Kanya.

After passing out of the university, Faruque Ahamed was involved in various NGOs including BRAC for a while.

He was first significantly discussed Imdadul Haque Milan's TV drama Boro rokomer manus by playing Rasiklal. Shortly thereafter, he came to the notice of Humayun Ahmed and acted in the play Achin brikhho directed by him. After that, he became Sadin Khasru and Dr. Ejajul  starred in Humayun Ahmed's popular series with Islam called Tara Tin Jon.

Farooq Ahmed also wrote the scripts of several plays including kal shaper donshon, uccho bonsho patra chai, digbaji, dui basinda and pani para. He directed the two dramas badragi badrul and how mau khaw.

He is mainly known as a theatre actor but has also acted in a few films.

Works

Theatres 
 Kirtankhola
 Pracha
 Keramat Mandal
 Cakra
 Yavati konnar mon

Television 

 Boro Rokomer Manush
 Ochin Brikhho
 Tara Tin Jon
 Aaj Robibar
 Brikhho Manob
 Grihosukh Pvt. Ltd.
 Bonur Golpo
 Hablonger Bazarey
 24 Caret Man
 Ghorer Khobor Porer Khobor
 Ami Aaj Bhejabo Chokh Somudro Joley!
 Ure Jai Bokpakkhi
 Tara Tinjon: Tea Master
 Juta Baba
 Mohan Choinik Chikitshok: Wang Pi
 Montri Mohodoyer Agomon Shubheccha Shagotom
 Yamuna'r Jol Dekhte Kalo
 Chor
 Homehappiness Pvt. Ltd.
 Jaitari
 The same case
 Ghost Luxury
 Silver Night
 Enayet Ali's Chhagol
 Hostage
 Behind the Scene
 FnF
 Graduate
 Jimmi
 Amra Jege Achi
 @18: All Time Dourer Upor
 Moneybag
 Faad O Bogar Golpo
 Sikander Box
 Behind the Trap
 Average Aslam
 Fatman
 Mahin Series
 Durer Bari Kacher Manush
 Chander Chada
 Behind The Puppy
 Syed Barir Bou
 Ekhane Keu Thakena 
 Ekhane Keu Thakena 2
 Stories of traps and bobas
 Para
 Hitler wants to die
 Hoichoi Paribaar
 Shanti Molom 10 Taka

Films 
 Nodir Naam Modhumoti (1996)
 Shyamol Chhaya (2004)
 Tok Jhaal Mishti (2005)
 Noy Number Bipod Sanket (2007)
 Ghetuputro Komola 
 Taarkata (2014)
 Krishnopokkho (2016)
 Voyangkor Sundor (2017)
 Fagun Haway (2019)
 August 1975 (2021)
 Shuklopokkho (2022)
 Agamikal (2022)
 Kanamachi (Upcoming)

Web series 
 Bhoyer Golpo - Murda Khat 
 Sabrina (2022)

Awards 
Impressed by Faruque Ahamed's performance, Humayun Ahmed dedicated his book ''Lilua Batas.

References

External links 
 
 

Living people
Jahangirnagar University alumni
Bangladeshi actors
People from Manikganj District
Year of birth missing (living people)